Umelo is a surname. Notable people with the surname include:

 Grace Umelo (born 1978), Nigerian athlete
 Rosina Umelo (born 1930), Nigerian writer

Surnames of Nigerian origin